Begonia festiva is a species of flowering plant in the family Begoniaceae.

References

festiva
Taxa named by William Grant Craib